Eagle Prairie may refer to:
Eagle Prairie Bridge
Eagle Prairie, former name of Rio Dell, California